Three point may refer to:
 Three Points, Arizona
 Three Points, California
 Three-point lighting, a photographer's method of illuminating a scene
 Three-point field goal, a field goal in a basketball game
 Three-point play, a basketball term
 Three-point hitch, a method of attaching implements to an agricultural tractor